George Pendle (born 1976) is a British author and journalist. He was educated at Stowe School and St Peter's College, Oxford.

After working at The Times from 1997 to 2001, Pendle wrote his first book, Strange Angel: The Otherworldly Life of Rocket Scientist John Whiteside Parsons (2005).

Pendle's second book – The Remarkable Millard Fillmore: The Unbelievable Life of a Forgotten President (2007) is a faux-biography of the unlucky thirteenth President of the United States of America, Millard Fillmore.

His third book, Death: A Life (2008), is a comedic autobiography of the personification of Death and how he deals with his purpose, life, and love.

A collection of his non-fiction writing was released under the title Happy Failure in 2014.

Pendle's articles can be found in the Financial Times, the Los Angeles Times, Frieze, Cabinet magazine, History Today, and Bidoun. He lives in New York City, where he has also written signs for the New York City Department of Parks and Recreation.

References

Bibliography
Strange Angel: The Otherworldly Life of Rocket Scientist John Whiteside Parsons (2005)  
The Remarkable Millard Fillmore: The Unbelievable Life of a Forgotten President (2007)  
Death: A Life (2008) 
Happy Failure (2014) 
The Book of Stamps, introduction by George Pendle (New York: Cabinet Books, 2008).

External links
George Pendle's official website

English non-fiction writers
21st-century English novelists
1976 births
Living people
The Times people
Alumni of St Peter's College, Oxford
English male novelists
21st-century English male writers
English male non-fiction writers
People educated at Stowe School